Comme des Cherokees is the sixth studio album of the French rock group Zebda, released in 2014. The album charted at 22 in France and 81 in Belgium.

Track listing
L'Envie	3:21	
A Suivre	3:15	
Les Petits Pas	3:50	
L'Accent Tué	3:51	
Le Panneau	3:29	
Appel D'Air	3:13	
Essai	3:23	
Fatou	3:18	
Les Chibanis	3:54	
Les Morfales	4:34

References

Zebda albums
2014 albums